Eilean Mòr is an island in Loch Langavat on the Isle of Lewis in the Outer Hebrides of Scotland.

Footnotes

Freshwater islands of the Outer Hebrides
Uninhabited islands of the Outer Hebrides